The 2022–23 season is the 126th season of competitive football by Heart of Midlothian. It is the club's second season of play back in the top tier of Scottish football since 2020, having been promoted from the Scottish Championship at the end of the previous season, having played just one season in the Scottish Championship.The club had been relegated from the Premiership at the end of the 2019–20 season.

They competed in the Europa League, and will compete in the Europa Conference League, Scottish League Cup and the Scottish Cup.

Results and fixtures

Pre-season / Friendlies

Scottish Premiership

Scottish League Cup

Scottish Cup

UEFA Europa League

Play-off round

UEFA Europa Conference League

Group stage

First team player statistics

Squad information
During the 2022–23 campaign, Hearts have used thirty players in competitive games. The table below shows the number of appearances and goals scored by each player.
{| class="wikitable" style="font-size: 100%; text-align: center;"
|-
! style="background:maroon; color:white;" scope="col" rowspan="2" width="10%" align="center"|Number
! style="background:maroon; color:white;" scope="col" rowspan="2" width="10%" align="center"|Position
! style="background:maroon; color:white;" scope="col" rowspan="2" width="10%" align="center"|Nation
! style="background:maroon; color:white;" scope="col" rowspan="2" width="20%" align="center"|Name
! style="background:maroon; color:white;" scope="col" colspan="2" align="center"|Totals
! style="background:maroon; color:white;" scope="col" colspan="2" align="center"|Premiership
! style="background:maroon; color:white;" scope="col" colspan="2" align="center"|Europe
! style="background:maroon; color:white;" scope="col" colspan="2" align="center"|League Cup
! style="background:maroon; color:white;" scope="col" colspan="2" align="center"|Scottish Cup
|-
! style="background:maroon; color:white;" scope="col" width=60 align="center"|Apps
! style="background:maroon; color:white;" scope="col" width=60 align="center"|Goals
! style="background:maroon; color:white;" scope="col" width=60 align="center"|Apps
! style="background:maroon; color:white;" scope="col" width=60 align="center"|Goals
! style="background:maroon; color:white;" scope="col" width=60 align="center"|Apps
! style="background:maroon; color:white;" scope="col" width=60 align="center"|Goals
! style="background:maroon; color:white;" scope="col" width=60 align="center"|Apps
! style="background:maroon; color:white;" scope="col" width=60 align="center"|Goals
! style="background:maroon; color:white;" scope="col" width=60 align="center"|Apps
! style="background:maroon; color:white;" scope="col" width=60 align="center"|Goals
|-
|-

 

 
Appearances (starts and substitute appearances) and goals include those in the Scottish Premiership, European Competitions, League Cup and the Scottish Cup.

Disciplinary record
During the 2022–23 season, Hearts players have so far been issued fifty-five yellow cards and seven red cards. The table below shows the number of cards and type shown to each player.
Last updated 11 March 2023

Goal scorers
Last updated 11 March 2023

Assists
Last updated 1 March 2023

Clean sheets
{| class="wikitable" style="font-size: 95%; text-align: center;"
|-
! style="background:maroon; color:white;" scope="col" width=60|
! style="background:maroon; color:white;" scope="col" width=60|
! style="background:maroon; color:white;" scope="col" width=60|
! style="background:maroon; color:white;" scope="col" width=150|Name
! style="background:maroon; color:white;" scope="col" width=80|Premiership
! style="background:maroon; color:white;" scope="col" width=80|League Cup
! style="background:maroon; color:white;" scope="col" width=80|Scottish Cup
! style="background:maroon; color:white;" scope="col" width=80|Europe
! style="background:maroon; color:white;" scope="col" width=80|Total
|-
| 1
|GK
|
|Zander Clark
|5
|0
|2
|0
|7
|-
|2
|GK
|
|Craig Gordon
|1
|0
|0
|1
|2
|-
|3
|GK
|
|Ross Stewart
|0
|0
|0
|0
|0
|-
! colspan=4 | Total
!6||0||2||1||9

Team statistics

League table

Conference League table

Division summary

Management statistics
Last updated 11 March 2023

Club

International Selection
Over the course of the season a number of the Hearts squad were called up on international duty. Craig Gordon was called up to represent Scotland, whilst Nathaniel Atkinson, Cameron Devlin and Kye Rowles were selected to represent Australia both in friendlies and at the 2022 FIFA World Cup.

Deaths
The following players and people associated with the club died over the course of the season. Former player and member of Hearts Hall of Fame Drew Busby, former player John Mackintosh,former chairman and chief executive Chris Robinson,former chairman Leslie Deans and former captain Chris Shevlane.

Transfers

Players in

Players out

Contract extensions
The following players extended their contracts with the club over the course of the season

See also
List of Heart of Midlothian F.C. seasons

Notes

References

2022-23
Scottish football clubs 2022–23 season